Shahanuddin Choudhury (born 15 June 1967) is a Bangladeshi sprinter. He competed in the men's 200 metres at the 1992 Summer Olympics.

References

External links
 

1967 births
Living people
Athletes (track and field) at the 1988 Summer Olympics
Athletes (track and field) at the 1992 Summer Olympics
Bangladeshi male sprinters
Bangladeshi male long jumpers
Olympic athletes of Bangladesh
Commonwealth Games competitors for Bangladesh
Athletes (track and field) at the 1990 Commonwealth Games
Place of birth missing (living people)